The Ministry of Foreign Affairs is a department of the Government of Kosovo in charge of foreign relations and the admission of Kosovo into the European Union and North Atlantic Treaty Organization (NATO).

Objectives 

Development of good relations with all neighbours
Implementation of Ahtisaari's Package
Acceleration of the process of international recognition of an independent, sovereign Kosovo
Completion of the structure and full functioning of the Ministry
Setting up of diplomatic services, embassies and consular units at the main centres and organisations in the world, according to the priorities set out by the Government, and in compliance with the Law on the Ministry of Foreign Affairs and Diplomatic Services of Kosovo, based on the decisions and coordination between the President, Prime Minister, Minister of Foreign Affairs and the Assembly
Full membership of the country in key organisations, international and regional financial institutions, according to certain priorities such as the International Monetary Fund, World Bank, etc. - jumpstarting Kosovo's accession to the UN, OSCE, NATO and EU.
Creation of the frame and environment for close cooperation with neighbouring countries, and at the regional level, in the areas of reciprocal interests
Promotion of political and economical interests of the Government of Republic of Kosovo;
Attraction of foreign investments
Protection of Kosovo citizens’ interests abroad
Affirmation of a distinguishable identity for Kosovo

Mission statement
The following is the mission statement of the Ministry of Foreign Affairs of the Republic of Kosovo:

Senior officials 

The senior officials in the ministry are as follows:

Officeholders (2008–present)

Notes

See also
 Politics of Kosovo
 Foreign relations of Kosovo
 International recognition of Kosovo
 List of diplomatic missions in Kosovo
 List of diplomatic missions of Kosovo

References

External links
  Ministry of Foreign Affairs
  Ministry of Foreign Affairs on Facebook
  Ministry of Foreign Affairs on Twitter
 
 Ministry of Foreign Affairs - Republic of Kosovo on Flickr

Foreign Affairs
Foreign relations of Kosovo
Kosovo
Kosovo, Foreign Affairs
Kosovan diplomats
Government of Kosovo